Klubi i Futbollit Shkëndija commonly known as Shkëndija, is a football club based in Tetovo, North Macedonia. Their home stadium is Ecolog Arena and they currently play in the Macedonian First League. In the 2010–11 season of the Macedonian First Football League, the club won its first major championship.

History

SFRY Period
KF Shkëndija was formed on 27 August 1979 by ethnic Albanians from Tetovo. The purpose of forming the club was so that the Albanians throughout Yugoslavia could unite in supporting a club for Albanians. FK Shkëndija was frowned upon by Yugoslav officials as it was thought the club would awaken nationalist feelings among the Albanians of Yugoslavia. Starting at the lowest division in Yugoslavia, the Municipal League, KF Shkëndija played their first match against FK Kosmos, winning 4–0.

Shkëndija won the division in the 1979–1980 season, resulting in Shkëndija being promoted into the Third division. After claiming the third division title in the 1980–1981 season, Shkëndija was then again promoted into the Second division. However, as the popularity of the club began to increase among the Albanian population of Yugoslavia, the ruling socialist government members disbanded the club, worried that the club would stoke ethnic tensions during a fragile period in SFRY.

Re-establishment
After Macedonia declared independence from Yugoslavia, KF Shkëndija was re-established into the Macedonian Football League. It started at the Fourth division, eventually being promoted each season to the third, second and finally, to the First division. In the 2010–11 season of the Macedonian First Football League the club won its first major championship with an unbeaten run of 16 games. On 20 May 2012, Shkëndija handed FK Vardar its first loss of the season with a 1–0 victory.

The Ecolog era

During the 2012–13 season, Shkëndija was embroiled in financial difficulties and as a result, many of its players left the club earlier in the summer. The Shkëndija supporters, the Ballistët, began a social media campaign requesting Ecolog to take over Shkëndija. Albanian international, Lorik Cana and Swiss international, Xherdan Shaqiri also joined the campaign with the supporters. On 31 July 2013, Lazim Destani, father of Ecolog founder and chairman, Nazif Destani, announced Ecolog International will take charge of Shkëndija.
Under the new administration, Shkëndija bought in over five new players to the squad, four days before the transfer season ended, as well as balancing the financial state of the club. The new season started averagely for Shkëndija, amassing five draws in a row. However, on 21 September 2013, Shkëndija comfortably defeated rivals FK Vardar in a 3–1 home game during the derby, displaying improvement of the club under Ecolog. However, for the next eight fixtures, Shkëndija were very inconsistent, drawing once, winning three and losing four. After losing 5–0 to FK Rabotnički, manager Gjore Jovanovski was relieved of his duties. Shpëtim Duro was named the manager Shkëndija just 15 hours after the sacking of Jovanovski. He was first hired as a temporary caretaker manager for the club's the remaining 3 games before the long winter break, but signed a contract with the club to be the manager for the remainder of the 2013–14 season.

During the winter break, Shkëndija was the most active team in the Prva Liga during the transfer period, bringing in 9 new players, further revamping the football club in preparation for the second half of the season. The second half of the season saw drastic improvement for Shkëndija under Shpëtim Duro, moving them from 8th position near the relegation zone, to 4th position at the end of the season, winning their final seven games in a row. Shkendija earned a spot in the 2014–15 first qualifying round of the UEFA Europa League.

Supporters

The supporters of Shkëndija are called the Ballistët, named after the fascist World War II Balli Kombëtar. When the club was formed in 1979, use of nationalism was strictly prohibited by the Yugoslav government. The supporting firm of Shkëndija called themselves BAL, using the first three letters of Balli Kombëtar. When Shkëndija was reinstated into the Macedonian Football League, the supporting firm was re-established as the Ballistët in 1992. When kick-off commences, the Ballistët always sing the national anthem of Albania. The ultras of Shkëndija are notorious for their hardline nationalistic rhetoric and pride in their Albanian heritage.

Rivalry
Being a club with a strong Albanian nationalist background, Shkëndija has rivalry with most of the Macedonian football clubs. However, the biggest rivalry are with FK Vardar and FK Teteks. The Shkëndija-Teteks rivalry is one of the biggest and most heated in North Macedonia. When Shkëndija play against Teteks, the majority of the Tetovo police are stationed at Ecolog Arena.  Shkendija supporters are banned from attending Vardar-Shkendija matches in Skopje.

Players

Current squad

Out on loan

Personnel

Current technical staff

Management

Honours

League
Macedonian First League:
Champions(4): 2010–11, 2017–18, 2018–19, 2020–21
Runners-up: 2015–16, 2016–17

Macedonian Second League:
Winners(3): 1995–96, 1999–2000, 2009–10

Cups
Macedonian Football Cup:
Winners(2): 2016, 2018
Runners-up: 2005–06, 2012–13, 2016–17

Macedonian Football Supercup:
Winners(1): 2011

Recent seasons

1The 2019–20 season was abandoned due to the COVID-19 pandemic in North Macedonia.

Shkëndija in Europe
Accurate as of 11 August 2022

Overview

Matches
{| class="wikitable"
! Season
! Competition
! Round
! Club
! Home
! Away
! Aggregate
!
|-
| 2011–12
| UEFA Champions League
| 2QR
|  Partizan
| style="text-align:center; background:#fdd;"| 0–1
| style="text-align:center; background:#fdd;"| 0–4
| style="text-align:center;| 0–5
| 
|-
| 2012–13
| UEFA Europa League
| 1QR
|  Portadown
| style="text-align:center; background:#ffd;"| 0–0
| style="text-align:center; background:#fdd;"| 1–2
| style="text-align:center;| 1–2
| 
|-
| 2014–15
| UEFA Europa League
| 1QR
|  Zimbru
| style="text-align:center; background:#dfd;"| 2–1
| style="text-align:center; background:#fdd;"| 0–2
| style="text-align:center;| 2–3
| 
|-
| 2015–16
| UEFA Europa League
| 1QR
|  Aberdeen
| style="text-align:center; background:#ffd;"| 1–1
| style="text-align:center; background:#ffd;"| 0–0
| style="text-align:center;| 1–1 (a)
| 
|-
| rowspan="4"| 2016–17
| rowspan="4"| UEFA Europa League
| 1QR
|  Cracovia
| style="text-align:center; background:#dfd;"| 2–0
| style="text-align:center; background:#dfd;"| 2–1
| style="text-align:center;| 4–1
| 
|-
| 2QR
|  Neftçi
| style="text-align:center; background:#dfd;"| 1–0
| style="text-align:center; background:#ffd;"| 0–0
| style="text-align:center;| 1–0
| 
|-
| 3QR
|  Mladá Boleslav
| style="text-align:center; background:#dfd;"| 2–0
| style="text-align:center; background:#fdd;"| 0–1
| style="text-align:center;| 2–1
| 
|-
| PO
|  Gent
| style="text-align:center; background:#fdd;"| 0–4
| style="text-align:center; background:#fdd;"| 1–2
| style="text-align:center;| 1–6
| 
|-
| rowspan="4"| 2017–18
| rowspan="4"| UEFA Europa League
| 1QR
|  Dacia
| style="text-align:center; background:#dfd;"| 3–0
| style="text-align:center; background:#dfd;"| 4–0
| style="text-align:center;| 7–0
| 
|-
| 2QR
|  HJK
| style="text-align:center; background:#dfd;"| 3–1
| style="text-align:center; background:#ffd;"| 1–1
| style="text-align:center;| 4–2
| 
|-
| 3QR
|  Trakai
| style="text-align:center; background:#dfd;"| 3–0
| style="text-align:center; background:#fdd;"| 1–2
| style="text-align:center;| 4–2
| 
|-
| PO
|  Milan
| style="text-align:center; background:#fdd;"| 0–1
| style="text-align:center; background:#fdd;"| 0–6
| style="text-align:center;| 0–7
| 
|-
| rowspan="4"| 2018–19
| rowspan="3"| UEFA Champions League
| 1QR
|  The New Saints
| style="text-align:center; background:#dfd;"| 5–0
| style="text-align:center; background:#fdd;"| 0−4
| style="text-align:center;| 5–4
| 
|-
| 2QR
|  Sheriff
| style="text-align:center; background:#dfd;"| 1–0
| style="text-align:center; background:#ffd;"| 0–0
| style="text-align:center;| 1–0
|  
|-
| 3QR
|  Red Bull Salzburg
| style="text-align:center; background:#fdd;"| 0−1
| style="text-align:center; background:#fdd;"| 0−3
| style="text-align:center;| 0–4
| 
|-
| UEFA Europa League
| PO
|  Rosenborg
| style="text-align:center; background:#fdd;"| 0−2
| style="text-align:center; background:#fdd;"| 1−3
| style="text-align:center;| 1–5
| 
|-
| rowspan="2"| 2019–20
| UEFA Champions League
| 1QR
|  Nõmme Kalju
| style="text-align:center; background:#fdd;"| 1–2
| style="text-align:center; background:#dfd;"| 1–0
| style="text-align:center;| 2−2 (a)
| 
|-
| UEFA Europa League
| 2QR
|  F91 Dudelange
| style="text-align:center;; background:#fdd;"| 1–2
| style="text-align:center; background:#ffd;"| 1–1
| style="text-align:center;| 2−3
| 
|-
| rowspan="3"| 2020–21
| rowspan="3"| UEFA Europa League
| 1QR
|  Sumgayit 
| 
| style="text-align:center; background:#dfd;"| 2–0
| 
|  
|-
| 2QR
|  Botoșani
| 
| style="text-align:center; background:#dfd;"| 1–0
| 
| 
|-
| 3QR
|  Tottenham Hotspur
| style="text-align:center;; background:#fdd;"| 1–3
| 
| 
| 
|-
| rowspan="2"| 2021–22
| UEFA Champions League
| 1QR
|  Mura
| style="text-align:center;; background:#fdd;"| 0–1
| style="text-align:center;; background:#fdd;"| 0−5
| style="text-align:center;| 0–6
| 
|-
| UEFA Europa Conference League
| 2QR
|  Riga
| style="text-align:center;; background:#fdd;"| 0−1
| style="text-align:center;; background:#fdd;"| 0−2
| style="text-align:center;| 0−3
| 
|-
| rowspan="3"| 2022–23
| rowspan="3"| UEFA Europa Conference League
| 1QR
|  Ararat Yerevan
| style="text-align:center; background:#dfd;"| 2–0
| style="text-align:center; background:#ffd;"| 2–2
| style="text-align:center;| 4–2
| 
|-
| 2QR
|  Valmiera
| style="text-align:center; background:#dfd;"| 3–1
| style="text-align:center; background:#dfd;"| 2–1
| style="text-align:center;| 5–2
| 
|-
| 3QR
|  AIK
| style="text-align:center; background:#ffd;"| 1–1 
| style="text-align:center; background:#ffd;"| 1–1
| style="text-align:center;| 2–2 
| 
|}

Notes
 1QR: First qualifying round
 2QR: Second qualifying round
 3QR: Third qualifying round
 PO': Play-off round

UEFA club coefficient rankingAs of 4.09.2021, Source: Top goalscorers in EuropeAs of 11.08.2022, Source: kfshkendija.comHistorical list of coaches

 Zoran Smileski (Jul 1992 – Jun 1995)
 Ajet Shosholli (1995 – 1996)
 Edmond Miha (1999)
 Zoran Smileski (Jul 1999 – Jun 2000)
 Idriz Sulejmani (2000 – 2001)
 Zoran Smileski (2001)
 Medin Zhega (2002)
 Buran Beadini (2003 – 2004)
 Iskender Junuzi (Jul 2004 – Nov 2004)
 Nexhat Huseini (28 Nov 2004 – Jun 2006)
 Edmond Miha (2006 – Apr 2007)
 Ibrahim Ljuma (14 Apr 2007 – Jun 2007)
 Qatip Osmani (Jul 2007 – Oct 2007)
 Zoran Smileski (28 Oct 2007 – Mar 2008)
 Borce Hristov (21 Mar 2008 – 1 May 2008)
 Ejup Sulejmani (2 May 2008 – )
 Zoran Stratev (Jan 2009 – Jun 2009)
 Qatip Osmani (Jul 2009 – Sep 2010)
 Edmond Miha (16 Sep 2010 – 1 Nov 2010)
 Qatip Osmani (6 Nov 2010 – 30 Sep 2011)
 Erhan Salimi (interim) (Oct 2011)
 Nexat Shabani (11 Oct 2011 – 20 Mar 2012)
 Qatip Osmani (21 Mar 2012 - 31 Jul 2012)
 Ibrahim Luma (interim) (Aug 2012)
 Artim Shaqiri (22 Aug 2012 – 4 Jul 2013)
 Gjore Jovanovski (1 Aug 2013 - 24 Nov 2013)
 Shpëtim Duro (24 Nov 2013 – 24 May 2014)
 Roy Ferenčina (6 Jun 2014 - 31 Aug 2014)
 Jeton Beqiri (interim) (Sep 2014)
 Ardian Kozniku (4 Sep 2014 – 27 Mar 2015)
 Jeton Beqiri (27 Mar 2015 - 25 May 2015)
 Shpëtim Duro (12 Jun 2015 - 22 Dec 2015)
 Bruno Akrapović (22 Dec 2015 – 27 Oct 2016)
 Jeton Beqiri (interim) (28 Oct 2016 - 31 Dec 2016)
 Thomas Brdarić (7 Jan 2017 - 10 May 2017)
 Erhan Salimi (interim) (May 2017)
 Qatip Osmani (Jun 2017 – Sep 2019)
 Erhan Salimi (interim)'' (Sep 2019 - Oct 2019)
 Ernest Gjoka (10 Oct 2019 – Aug 2021)
 Bruno Akrapović (2 Aug 2021 – Jun 2022)
 Artim Shaqiri (Jun 2022 – Sep 2022)
 Qatip Osmani (Sep 2022 –)

References

External links

 
Fan Website 

Club info at MacedonianFootball 
Supporters Website 
Football Federation of Macedonia 

 
1979 establishments in the Socialist Republic of Macedonia
Association football clubs established in 1979
Football clubs in North Macedonia
Shkëndija